The Men's keirin at the 2013 UCI Track Cycling World Championships was held on February 22. 28 athletes participated in the contest. After the 4 qualifying heats, the fastest two riders in each heat advanced to the second round. The riders that did not advance to the second round, raced in 4 repechage heats. The first rider in each heat advanced to the second round along with the 8 that qualified before.

The first 3 riders from each of the 2 Second Round heats advanced to the Final and the remaining riders raced a consolation 7–12 final.

Medalists

Results

First round
The heats were held at 13:30.

Heat 1

Heat 2

Heat 3

Heat 4

First Round Repechage
The heats were held at 14:55.

Heat 1

Heat 2

Heat 3

Heat 4

Second round
The heats were held at 19:50.

Heat 1

Heat 2

Finals
The finals were held at 21:15.

Small Final

Final

References

2013 UCI Track Cycling World Championships
UCI Track Cycling World Championships – Men's keirin